The borosulfates are heteropoly anion compounds which have sulfate groups attached to boron atoms. Other possible terms are sulfatoborates or boron-sulfur oxides. The ratio of sulfate to borate reflects the degree of condensation. With  [B(SO4)4]5- there is no condensation, each ion stands alone. In [B(SO4)3]3- the anions are linked into a chain, a chain of loops, or as [B2(SO4)6]6− in a cycle. Finally in [B(SO4)2]− the sulfate and borate tetrahedra are all linked into a two or three-dimensional network. These arrangements of oxygen around boron and sulfur can have forms resembling silicates. The first borosulfate to be discovered was K5[B(SO4)4] in 2012. Over 75 unique compounds are known.

They are distinct from the borate sulfates which have separate, uncondensed sulfate and borate ions.

Related compounds include boroselenates, borotellurates, and also boroantimonates, borogallates, borogermanates, borophosphates, boroselenites and borosilicates.

Formation 
Borosulfates are formed by heating boric oxide, oleum, or sulfuric acid, with metal carbonates. The degree of condensation is varied with the ratio of oleum to sulfuric acid. Pure oleum is more likely to yield compounds with disulfate groups.

Reactions 
When heated to around 500 °C the borosulfates decompose by emitting SO3 vapour and form a metal sulfate and boric oxide.

List

References

Borates
Sulfates